Joseph William Gillingham  (born 27 February 1974) is a South African former rugby union player.

Playing career
Gillingham represented  at the 1992 Craven Week tournament for schoolboys and was selected for the South African Schools team in 1992. In 1998 he joined , playing provincial rugby for the union and super rugby for the Coastal Sharks. At the end of the 1996 season, he toured with the Springboks to Argentina and Europe. Gillingham did not play in any test matches but played in seven tour matches, scoring one try for the Springboks.

See also
List of South Africa national rugby union players – Springbok no. 640
List of South Africa national under-18 rugby union team players

References

1974 births
Living people
South African rugby union players
South Africa international rugby union players
Golden Lions players
Sharks (Currie Cup) players
Sharks (rugby union) players
Rugby union centres
Rugby union wings
Rugby union players from Johannesburg